Laboratory for Electro-Optics Systems is a research lab belonging to Indian Space Research Organisation. It involves in design and development of optics and sensor modules that can be deployed either onboard satellite or with the launch vehicle.

History
Established in 1993, Laboratory for Electro-Optics Systems was established at the same place where the first Indian satellite Aryabhatta was fabricated in 1975, namely Bangalore. The laboratory has developed sensors for tracking Earth and Stars for the satellites which were launched when the space research was ushering in India. Satellites like Aryabata, Bhaskara, Apple, IRS, SROSS and INSAT-2 have been equipped with the sensors developed by this laboratory. The lab has also participated in the India's first moon mission Chandrayaan-1. They have an instrument in ISRO's upcoming mission to Sun, Aditya-L1 too.

References

External links 
 Laboratory for Electro-Optics Systems

Indian Space Research Organisation facilities
1993 establishments in Karnataka
Research institutes in Bangalore
Research institutes established in 1993